AKR may refer to:

Akron Fulton International Airport, Ohio, US, FAA LID
Auroral kilometric radiation
Araki, a Malayso Polynesian language with the ISO 639-3 code akr.
New Kosovo Alliance, a political party
AKR Corporindo, an oil company in Indonesia.